X Faktors is the Latvian version of The X Factor, a series originating from the United Kingdom. Based on the original British show, the concept of the Latvian version, as is common with international installments, is to find new singing talent (solo or groups) contested by aspiring singers drawn from public auditions. The Latvian version first aired on 3 September 2017.

Season summary
To date, four seasons have been broadcast, as summarised below.

 Team Reinis Sējāns
 Team Aija Auškāpa
 Team Intars Busulis
 Team Marats Ogļezņevs

Judges' categories and their contestants
In each season, each judge is allocated a category to mentor and chooses three acts to progress to the live finals. This table shows, for each season, which category each judge was allocated and which acts he or she put through to the live finals.

Key:
 – Winning judge/category. Winners are in bold, eliminated contestants in small font.

Season 1

Contestants
Key:

 – Winner
 – Runner-up
 – Third Place

Results summary
Colour key

Season 2

Contestants
Key:
 – Winner
 – Runner-up
 – Third Place

Results summary
Colour key

Season 3

Contestants
Key:
 – Winner
 – Runner-up
 – Third Place

Results summary
Colour key

Season 4

Contestants
Key:
 – Winner
 – Runner-up
 – Third Place

Results summary
Colour key

Trivia
Both Roberts Memmēns and Dagnis Roziņš are current members of the pop-rap group Citi Zēni, who gained popularity as the Latvian entry for 2022 Eurovision Song Contest with the song, Eat Your Salad.

References

External links
 Official website

Lativa
Latvian television series
2010s Latvian television series
Non-British television series based on British television series
Television series by Fremantle (company)
2017 Latvian television series debuts
TV3 (Latvia) original programming